Spodnje Verjane is a small settlement in the Municipality of Sveta Trojica v Slovenskih Goricah in northeastern Slovenia. The area is part of the traditional region of Styria. It is now included with the rest of the municipality in the Drava Statistical Region.

A small roadside chapel in the settlement dates to 1880.

References

External links
Spodnje Verjane at Geopedia

Populated places in the Municipality of Sveta Trojica v Slovenskih Goricah